Sri Lanka competed at the 2011 Commonwealth Youth Games in Isle of Man from 7 to 13 September 2011. The Sri Lankan National Olympic Committee selected 25 competitors to participate in 5 different sports. Sri Lanka finished in the 17th place with a silver medal and one bronze medal.

References

Nations at the 2011 Commonwealth Youth Games
2011 in Sri Lankan sport